Sushil Bose (22 December 1911 – 6 February 1989) was an Indian cricketer. He played fifteen first-class matches for Bengal between 1935 and 1949.

See also
 List of Bengal cricketers

References

External links
 

1911 births
1989 deaths
Indian cricketers
Bengal cricketers
Cricketers from Kolkata